Ian Alistar Allison (July 26, 1909 – August 4, 1990) was a Canadian basketball player who competed in the 1936 Summer Olympics.  His is the only Canadian basketball team to date to win a medal at the Olympics, a silver and also the last to win a team medal.  He played all six matches including the final. He was high scorer with 4 points in Canada's 19–8 loss to the Americans.

Early life and working life
Allison was born in Greenock, Scotland and, while still young, migrated to Canada with his family. They lived across from Walkerville Collegiate Institute, the school he attended for high school.  He then attended Assumption College and finally University of Toronto. After graduation, he went back to Walkerville to work as a teacher. A year later he married one of the secretaries of the school - Jean Alberta Reid, and eventually the couple had two daughters - Heather and Janey. Allison retired from teaching in 1973. He is an inductee into the Windsor Essex Sports Hall of Fame.

References

External links
Olympic profile
Walkerville Times: The Major Local Olympian Ian Allison Remembered

1909 births
1990 deaths
Basketball players at the 1936 Summer Olympics
Basketball position missing
Canadian men's basketball players
Olympic basketball players of Canada
Olympic medalists in basketball
Olympic silver medalists for Canada
Scottish emigrants to Canada
Sportspeople from Greenock
Basketball players from Windsor, Ontario
University of Toronto alumni
Medalists at the 1936 Summer Olympics